Vongo may refer to:
 Vongo, a village in Kouritenga Province, Burkina Faso
 Vongo, a video on demand service from Starz Entertainment